Bolaamphiphiles (also known as bolaform surfactants,
bolaphiles, or alpha-omega-type surfactants) are amphiphilic molecules that have hydrophilic groups at both ends of a sufficiently long hydrophobic hydrocarbon chain. Compared to single-headed amphiphiles, the introduction of a second head-group generally induces a higher solubility in water, an increase in the critical micelle concentration (cmc), and a decrease in aggregation number. The aggregate morphologies of bolaamphiphiles include spheres, cylinders, disks, and vesicles. Bolaamphiphiles are also known to form helical structures that can form monolayer microtubular self-assemblies.

References

 Fuhrhop, J-H; Wang, T. Bolaamphiphile, Chem. Rev. (2004), 104(6), 2901-2937.
 Chen, Yuxia; Liu, Yan; Guo, Rong.  Aggregation behavior of an amino acid-derived bolaamphiphile and a conventional surfactant mixed system.    Journal of Colloid and Interface Science  (2009),  336(2),  766-772.  CODEN: JCISA5  .  AN 2009:776584
 Yin, Shouchun; Wang, Chao; Song, Bo; Chen, Senlin; Wang, Zhiqiang.  Self-Organization of a Polymerizable Bolaamphiphile Bearing a Diacetylene Group and L-Aspartic Acid Group.    Langmuir  (2009),  25(16),  8968-8973.  CODEN: LANGD5  .  CAN 151:173915  AN 2009:383258
 Wang, H.; Li, M.; Xu, Z.; Qiao, W.; Li, Z.  Interfacial tension of unsymmetrical bolaamphiphile surfactant in surfactant/alkali/crude oil systems.    Energy Sources, Part A: Recovery, Utilization, and Environmental Effects  (2008),  30(16),  1442-1450.  CODEN: ESPACB  .  CAN 150:475745  AN 2008:763292
 Chen, Senlin; Song, Bo; Wang, Zhiqiang; Zhang, Xi.  Self-Organization of Bolaamphiphile Bearing Biphenyl Mesogen and Aspartic-Acid Headgroups.    Journal of Physical Chemistry C  (2008),  112(9),  3308-3313.  CODEN: JPCCCK  .  CAN 148:372219  AN 2008:176360
 Feng Qiu, Chengkang Tang, Yongzhu Chen Amyloid-like aggregation of designer bolaamphiphilic peptides: Effect of hydrophobic section and hydrophilic heads. Journal of peptide science. (2017) DOI: 10.1002/psc.3062

Organic chemistry
Physical chemistry
Surfactants